Asuncion 'Sonia' Bruce (born 1966) is an Philippines international lawn bowler.

Bowls career
Bruce competed in the 2008 World Outdoor Bowls Championship and 2012 World Outdoor Bowls Championship but came to prominence when winning a bronze medal at the 2016 World Outdoor Bowls Championship in Christchurch in the fours with Hazel Jagonoy, Rosita Bradborn and Ronalyn Greenlees.

In 2014 and 2016, she won the Hong Kong International Bowls Classic pairs titles, first with Ainie Knight and later with Rosita Bradborn.

She has won four medals at the Asia Pacific Bowls Championships, starting in 2003 in Brisbane, where she won a bronze medal in the triples with Lolita Treasure and Milagros Witheridge. Six years later she won a second bronze, again in the triples with Witheridge and Greenlees. Two years later in 2011, she won a silver in Adelaide with Witehridge and Joy Tordoff and finally in 2015 in Christchurch, she secured another bronze but this time in the pairs event with Ainee Knight.

References

1966 births
Filipino female lawn bowls players
Living people
Sportspeople from Negros Occidental
Southeast Asian Games medalists in lawn bowls
Southeast Asian Games silver medalists for the Philippines
Southeast Asian Games bronze medalists for the Philippines
Competitors at the 2017 Southeast Asian Games
Competitors at the 2019 Southeast Asian Games
Competitors at the 2005 Southeast Asian Games
Competitors at the 2007 Southeast Asian Games
20th-century Filipino women
21st-century Filipino women